Hutber's law states that "improvement means deterioration". It is founded on the cynical observation that a stated improvement actually hides a deterioration.

The term has seen wide application in business, engineering, and risk analysis. It was first articulated in the 1970s by Patrick Hutber, an economist and journalist who was the City Editor for The Sunday Telegraph in London from 1966 to 1979.

See also
 Law (principle)
 List of eponymous laws
 Newspeak
 Parkinson's law
 Unintended consequence

References 
 Hutber's law quoted in the House of Commons, 1990
 Passing reference to Hutber's law
 "Leading Article: Figuring it Out," The Guardian. 15 April 1994, p. 21. 
 The Scotsman. 13 Sept. 1994.
 Tim Satchell. "Patience is the hardest virtue: Tim Satchell explains why it took two years to secure the money he was owed." Daily Telegraph. 20 January 2001, p. 06.
 "Pay any price to beat poverty." New Statesman. 26 November 2001.

Adages
Risk analysis